A skateboard style refers to the way a skateboarder prefers to ride a skateboard. Skateboard styles can be broadly divided into two different categories: skateboarding to perform tricks and skateboarding as a means of transportation. Styles of skateboarding have evolved over time and are influenced by a number of factors including sociocultural evolution, mass media, music, technology, corporate influence and individual skill level.

The styles used by different skateboarders when riding skateboards should not be confused with skater style, the manner in which skateboarders dress or act in relation to skateboarding culture.

Styles

Freestyle

Probably the oldest style of skateboarding, freestyle skateboarding developed from the use of skateboards as a mode of transport in the 1960s. Professional freestyle competitions often involved music and choreography and focused on fluidity and technical skill. The style changed significantly with the introduction of ollies and other tricks in the 1980s and the introduction of various obstacle elements.

Vert

Vert skateboarding has its genesis in "pool riding" - the riding of skateboards in emptied backyard swimming pools - during the 1970s. It involves skateboard riders moving from the horizontal (on the ground) to the vertical (on a ramp or other incline) to perform tricks - thus "vert". It is also referred to as "transition skateboarding" or "tranny skating". Skateboarders usually set-up their boards with 55mm (or larger) wheels and wider decks for more stability.

Street

Street skateboarding involves the use of urban obstacles like stairs and their handrails, planter boxes, drainage ditches, park benches and other street furniture. Skaters perform tricks around, on, onto or over these obstacles. Skateboarders usually set-up their boards with 55mm (or smaller) wheels and narrower decks to make the board flip and spin faster and to make performing tricks easier.

Park

Park skateboarding encompasses a variety of sub-styles adopted by those who ride skateboards in purpose-built skate parks. Most skate parks combine halfpipes and quarterpipes with various other "vert" skateboarding features as well as "street" obstacles such as stairs, ledges, and rails. The integration of these elements produces a different skating experience.

Slalom And One Wheel
"Slalom" skateboarding is the best way of showing your skateboarding skills. What it basically does is pass the plastic cones while skateboarding. You can't touch the board with the cones, if it gets touched, you will lose the competition. It has been called course competitions. Lots of skaters love to take part. The "one-wheel" skateboarding is a difficult style for all skateboarders. It needs a lot of balance and practice to be good at it. As the name is showing that the board includes only one wheel and you have to ride it with good balance ability.

Cruising
Cruising can be achieved with any type of skateboard through general urban areas without tricks. Skateboarders in this category often use "cruisers" which are generally wider and have rubbery wheels. Cruising, similarly to Downhill Skateboarding, is often used for transportation.

Downhill

Non-competition downhill skateboarding is one of the oldest styles of skateboarding and was popular in the early 1970s. Original longboards were described as being like snow skis (in terms of length). Modern riders often use longboards for races, but some use regular skateboards for non-competition downhill skateboarding.

Other styles
 Big Air Skateboarding was invented when Danny Way and DC Shoes created the "Mega Ramp", with a giant "roll in" for speed followed by a large launch ramp, a (approximately) 50 foot gap and (approximately) 25 foot quarterpipe. It has recently become popular enough to be an event in the X-games, and they are now adding other obstacles such as rails in the gap.
Grass surfing

References